The Setúbal Peninsula is a peninsula in the Lisbon Region of Portugal. The peninsula is named after one of its larger cities, Setúbal, and is bordered by three bodies of water, the Atlantic Ocean in the west and southwest, the Tagus Estuary to the north and the Sado Estuary to the southeast.

Peninsulas of Portugal